Shakuntala is a 1965 Indian Malayalam-language film, directed and produced by Kunchacko. The film stars Prem Nazir, Sathyan, Thikkurissy Sukumaran Nair and Prema. The film had musical score by G. Devarajan and K. Raghavan. The film is adapted from the 1961 Bollywood film Stree. The film had its opening sequence in Eastmancolor.

Cast

Prem Nazir
Kalaikkal Kumaran
Sathyan
Thikkurissy Sukumaran Nair
Prema
Aranmula Ponnamma
KS Gopinath
Rajasree
Jolly
K. R. Vijaya
MS Namboothiri
Rani

Soundtrack

References

External links
 

1965 films
1960s Malayalam-language films
Films based on works by Kalidasa
Works based on Shakuntala (play)
Films scored by G. Devarajan
Films scored by K. Raghavan